Brian Taylor (born 12 February 1954) is an English former footballer who played as a defender in the Football League in the 1960s and 1970s.

He started as a trainee with Middlesbrough in 1969 but after 18 league appearances he transferred to Doncaster Rovers in 1975, making his debut on 6 December 1975 against Torquay United.

After making 131 senior appearances for Rovers he transferred to Rochdale, and made over 150 league appearances for them.

References 

1954 births
People from Bolsover
Footballers from Derbyshire
Association football defenders
English Football League players
Middlesbrough F.C. players
Doncaster Rovers F.C. players
Rochdale A.F.C. players
Living people
English footballers